Pediolophodon is an extinct elephantoid proboscidean genus from the middle to late Miocene of North America (Nebraska and Texas). Pediolophodon was a close relative of elephants (members of the Elephantinae subfamily of Elephantidae) and would have appeared superficially similar to them, but was not itself a true elephant.

Two species are recognized, P. campester and P. fricki. Both were originally assigned to the Old World genus Tetralophodon, but discoveries in the Kepler Quarry, Nebraska, showed these taxa to be generically distinct.

References

Elephantoidea
Miocene proboscideans
Miocene mammals of North America
Prehistoric placental genera
Paleontology in Nebraska